Fundamenta Mathematicae is a peer-reviewed scientific journal of mathematics with a special focus on the foundations of mathematics, concentrating on set theory, mathematical logic, topology and its interactions with algebra, and dynamical systems. Originally it only covered topology, set theory, and foundations of mathematics: it was the first specialized journal in the field of mathematics. It is published by the Mathematics Institute of the Polish Academy of Sciences.

History 
The journal was conceived by Zygmunt Janiszewski as a means to foster mathematical research in Poland. Janiszewski required that, in order to achieve its goal, the journal should not force Polish mathematicians to submit articles written exclusively in Polish, and should be devoted only to a specialized topic in mathematics: as a consequence of these requirements, Fundamenta Mathematicae become the first specialized journal in the field of mathematics.

Despite the fact that Janiszewski gave the impetus for the development of the journal in an article written in 1918, he did not live so long to see the first published issue since he died on 3 January 1920. Wacław Sierpiński and Stefan Mazurkiewicz took over the role of editors-in-chief. The journal was published in Warsaw. Soon after the launch of the publication, the founding editors were joined by Kazimierz Kuratowski, and later by Karol Borsuk.

Abstracting and indexing 
The journal is abstracted and indexed in the Science Citation Index Expanded, Scopus, and Zentralblatt MATH. According to the Journal Citation Reports, the journal has a 2016 impact factor of 0.609.

Notes

References

External links
 
 Online archive: 1920-2000 at Polish Digital Mathematical Library
 Fundamenta Mathematicae (1920-2016) at European Digital Mathematics Library

Mathematics journals
Mass media in Poland
Publications established in 1920
Polish Academy of Sciences academic journals
English-language journals